First Thomas Shoal, also known as Bulig Shoal in the Philippines, Bãi Suối Ngà in Vietnam, and 信义礁 in China, is an uninhabited reef/atoll located  south of Second Thomas Shoal in the Spratly Islands of the South China Sea.

The shoal is one of three named after Thomas Gilbert, captain of the :

References

Shoals of the Spratly Islands